Big Lake is a body of water in Washington County, Maine. Known for smallmouth bass, Big Lake is the second largest lake in Washington County and one of the largest lakes in Maine. The lake is located in and around the Grand Lake Stream, near the border with New Brunswick. There are 28 islands on the lake. Big Lake constitutes part of the west branch of the Saint Croix River. Big Lake is a well-known location for anglers and other fresh water fishermen.

References

Lakes of Washington County, Maine
Lakes of Maine